The Österreichische Musikzeitschrift (ÖMZ, Austrian music magazine) was a monthly music magazine published in Vienna, Austria, by Verlag Musikzeit. It was established in 1945 by the Austrian cultural politician and music critic . It appeared until the end of 2010, edited by Marion Diederichs-Lafite with 745 issues. From 2011 to 2014, the magazine was published by Böhlau Verlag. From 2015 to the last edition in February 2018 it was published by Hollitzer.

References

Further reading 
 Manfred Permoser. (2000). "Die Rezeption zeitgenössischer Musik seit '45 im Spiegel der österreichischen Musikzeitschrift", in ÖMZ 55/7, .
 Marion Diederichs-Lafite. (1995). "Musik der Zeit – Zeit für Musik", in ÖMZ 50/11–12, .
 Rudolf Stephan. (1995) "Musikzeitschrift und musikalische Öffentlichkeit", in: ÖMZ 50/11–12, .
 Marion Diederichs-Lafite. (2010). "65 Jahre MUSIKZEITschrift", in ÖMZ 65/10–12, .

External links

1945 establishments in Austria
2018 disestablishments in Austria
Classical music magazines
Defunct magazines published in Austria
German-language magazines
Magazines established in 1945
Magazines disestablished in 2018
Magazines published in Vienna
Monthly magazines published in Austria